Yeni Həyat is a village and municipality in the Shamkir Rayon of Azerbaijan. It has a population of 3490.

References

Populated places in Shamkir District